Azdaran (also Romanized as Azdārān) is a village in Chehel Chay Rural District, in the Central District of Minudasht County, Golestan Province, Iran. At the 2006 census, its population was 185, in 54 families.

References 

Populated places in Minudasht County